The ocellate topeshark (Hemitriakis complicofasciata) is a species of houndshark, belonging to the family Triakidae. It is found in the western Pacific from the Ryukyu Islands to the Philippines and Taiwan.

References

 Compagno, Dando, & Fowler, Sharks of the World, Princeton University Press, New Jersey 2005 
 

ocellate topeshark
Fish of the Pacific Ocean
ocellate topeshark